William R. Bright (October 19, 1921 – July 19, 2003) was an American evangelist. In 1951 at the University of California, Los Angeles he founded Campus Crusade for Christ  as a ministry for university students. In 1952 he wrote The Four Spiritual Laws. In 1979 he produced the film Jesus.

In 1996 Bill Bright was awarded the $1.1 million Templeton Prize for Progress in Religion, and donated the money to promote the spiritual benefits of fasting and prayer. In 2001 he stepped down as leader of the organization and Steve Douglass became president. He died in 2003.

Early life
Bill Bright was born in Coweta, Oklahoma on October 19, 1921. He was the sixth child and fifth son of Forrest Dale and Mary Lee Rohl Bright. His father Forrest Dale was a cattle rancher while his mother Mary Lee was a school teacher prior to marrying Forrest. Bill's father Forrest was actively involved in the Oklahoma Republican Party with Bill remaining a staunch Republican throughout his life. Bill studied economics at Northeastern State University in Tahlequah, Oklahoma. As a student at Northeastern State University, he was initiated into the Zeta chapter of the Sigma Tau Gamma fraternity, and has subsequently been granted honorable alumnus status to the Alpha Gamma Omega Christ-Centered Fraternity. In 1942, Bill enlisted in the United States Navy Reserve but did not see combat service due to a burst eardrum from playing football during high school.
 
While in his early 20s he moved to Los Angeles, California and founded a company called "Bright's California Confections." During the 1940s, Bill attended the First Presbyterian Church, Hollywood where he became an evangelical Christian. Bright was influenced by Henrietta Mears, who served as the Director of Christian Education at First Presbyterian Church, and Billy Graham, who later became a prominent American evangelical leader.

In 1946, Bill Bright quit his candy business to pursue Biblical studies and theology at Princeton and Fuller Theological Seminaries. According to the historian John G. Turner, Bright struggled with his academic studies and did not complete his degree at either institution. While studying at Fuller seminary, Bright felt what he regarded as the call of God to reach out to university students and abandoned his academic studies. Before starting his campus ministry, Bright sold off his confections company and settled a financial dispute with his former business partners, the Taylor family.

Family

Bill Bright married Vonette Bright on December 30, 1948. The two had been engaged to marry since the spring of 1946. However, Bill at the prompting of Zachary's parents agreed to delay the wedding until her impending 1948 graduation from Texas State College for Women. During the 1950s, Bill and Vonette adopted two boys named Brad and Zachary Bright.

Ministry career

Writings

In 1965, Bright wrote The Four Spiritual Laws, an evangelistic Christian tract. In the booklet he outlines his view of the essentials of the Christian faith concerning salvation. It is summarized as four spiritual laws or principles that govern what he sees as human beings' relationship with God. The booklet ends with a prayer of repentance.

Creation of Campus Crusade for Christ, early 1950s

Bright had initially planned to produce an evangelical film called "The Great Adventure" but abandoned the project due to a lack of funding. 

Though Bright had initially considered partnering with other churches, his disenchantment with their ability to mentor new Christian converts led him to start Campus Crusade for Christ as a parachurch organization. In 1951, after recruiting several volunteers from Fuller Seminary and Hollywood Presbyterian, Bright started Campus Crusade's first chapter at the University of California, Los Angeles (UCLA). According to Turner, Campus Crusade was also inspired by Bright's desire to combat Communist influence in US universities including UCLA, which was then regarded as a hotbed of student radicalism.

By 1952, Bright's Campus Crusade had reportedly converted 250 students at UCLA including the student body president, campus newspaper editor, and several athletes including African American decathlete and future Olympian Rafer Johnson. While Bill and his colleagues focused on the male students, Vonette focused on reaching out to the female students. 

In 1953, Campus Crusade established its headquarters in Los Angeles' Westwood Boulevard. Bright's campus outreach was also aided by his Hollywood Presbyterian mentor Henrietta Mears, who allowed the Brights to share her Bel Air home and spoke at several Crusade functions.

Expansion of Campus Crusade beyond UCLA

Bright's success at UCLA led him to establish Campus Crusade branches at several other US universities.

Campus Crusade's expansion across several US campuses created friction with other Christian campus groups including InterVarsity Christian Fellowship and liberal campus chaplains, who disagreed with the evangelistic tone of Bright's ministry. In 1956, Bright wrote a 20–minute evangelistic presentation called "God's Plan for Your Life", which set the tone for Campus Crusade's evangelism and discipleship program. Bright also initially partnered with the fundamentalist Bob Jones University. However, the relationship deteriorated after Bright sided with Billy Graham, who had accepted the sponsorship of liberal Protestants for his 1957 New York crusade. In response, Bob Jones Sr. and his son Bob Jones Jr. severed relations with Bright's ministry. According to Turner, this split with Bob Jones University led Bright to gravitate towards the "new evangelical" wing of the Protestant movement, which was associated with Billy Graham's cooperative evangelism. 

During the decades to follow, Bill Bright and his wife, Vonette Bright, continued this work, and the ministry expanded greatly. In 2011 Campus Crusade for Christ had 25,000 missionaries in 191 countries.

Later life
Bright held five honorary doctorate degrees: a Doctor of Laws from the Jeonbuk National University of Korea, a Doctor of Divinity from John Brown University, a Doctor of Letters from Houghton Seminary, a Doctor of Divinity from the Los Angeles Bible College and Seminary, and a Doctor of Laws from Pepperdine University.

In 1983, he chaired the National Committee for the National Year of the Bible. He was named the 1996 recipient of the $1.1 million Templeton Prize for Progress in Religion. He donated the prize money to causes promoting the spiritual benefits of fasting and prayer.

He wrote more than 100 books and booklets, and thousands of articles and pamphlets that have been distributed in most major languages by the millions. He endorsed the document Evangelicals and Catholics Together.
Bright was a co-founder of the Alliance Defense Fund, which funds high-profile litigation cases on behalf of Christians' First Amendment rights, as well as litigation to end abortion access and to restrict LGBTQ rights.  He was also a co-signatory of the Land letter of 2002 which outlined a just war rationale for the 2003 invasion of Iraq, providing a theological underpinning for the invasion being planned by President George W. Bush.

He produced the film Jesus in 1979, which was released by Warner Bros. in the United States. It was not a financial success, losing approximately $2 million. While praising its "meticulous attention to authenticity", critics panned the film for being "painfully monotonous". The Los Angeles Times called it a "...dull Sunday-School treatment of the life of Christ."

In 1988 he led  the protest against the Martin Scorsese film The Last Temptation of Christ and he called the film "blasphemous". He offered to buy the film's negative from Universal in order to destroy it.

Death
Bright died on July 19, 2003, in Orlando, Florida. He was survived by his wife Vonette, sons Zachary and Brad, and four grandchildren. His wife died in 2015.

The Rev. Billy Graham released a statement on Bright's death: "He has carried a burden on his heart as few men that I've ever known - a burden for the evangelization of the world. He is a man whose sincerity and integrity and devotion to our Lord have been an inspiration and a blessing to me ever since the early days of my ministry."

Politics
Bill Bright's father Dale Bright was a staunch Republican who served as the chairman of the Wagoner Country Republican Party. Like his father, Bill remained a staunch Republican supporter and voter throughout his life. As an evangelical Christian, Bright was also anti-Communist and stated that one of his reasons for starting Campus Crusade was to combat Communist influence in US universities. During the 1970s, Bright defended the South Korean President Park Chung-hee, who imposed martial law and assumed dictatorial powers. He claimed that Park was fighting against Communism and supported religious freedom.

See also 
 Seven Mountain Mandate

Further reading
Richardson, Michael (2001), Amazing Faith: The Authorized Biography of Bill Bright. Colorado Springs, CO WaterBrook.

References

External links
Cru.org

1921 births
2003 deaths
20th-century evangelicals
21st-century evangelicals
Alliance Defending Freedom people
American Christian missionaries
American evangelicals
California Republicans
Christians from California
Christians from Oklahoma
Fuller Theological Seminary alumni
Northeastern State University alumni
Oklahoma Republicans
People from Coweta, Oklahoma
Templeton Prize laureates